Lake Harmony is a  glacial lake in Kidder Township, Carbon County, Pennsylvania, United States. The lake is drained by the Tobyhanna Creek, which flows northwest into the Lehigh River. It shares its name with an adjacent village, which has a zip code of 18624.

References

External links

Harmony
Harmony
Protected areas of Carbon County, Pennsylvania